Yves Gaugler (born 10 June 1969) is a retired German football forward.

References

External links
 

1969 births
Living people
German footballers
VfL Bochum players
2. Bundesliga players
Association football forwards